Sir Everard Fawkener (1694–1758) was an English merchant and diplomat, chiefly remembered for his friendship with Voltaire. His daughter was the celebrated political hostess Harriet Bouverie.

Career
Fawkener was born into a family of silk merchants. His father, William (1642–1716) was a leading member of the Levant Company. Everard was sent out to Aleppo (a city presently located in Syria) in 1716 and remained there until 1725. He then worked in the family firm of Snelling and Fawkener, leading Levant merchants of their day until 1735.

He met the philosopher Voltaire in Paris, on his way home from Aleppo in 1725. Voltaire dedicated his tragedy Zaïre to Fawkener in 1733, and earlier stayed in Fawkener's house in Wandsworth during his lengthy stay in England in 1726. The two men kept up a warm and affectionate correspondence for many years. In November 1748 Voltaire wrote to Fawkener "Now you are a husband and a father and I hope a happy one".

Fawkener was knighted in 1735, being appointed as ambassador to the Ottoman Empire on 19 August 1735. He arrived at Constantinople on 19 December. He did not like it much there and got leave to return home on 8 November 1742. His credentials were finally recalled on 4 September 1746.

Upon his return, he became secretary to the Duke of Cumberland, a post which he held for the rest of his life. He was an eyewitness to the Battle of Fontenoy. He accompanied the Duke on his campaign in the Scottish Highlands to suppress the Jacobite rising of 1745. In 1745 he became Postmaster General. In this period he was a financial backer in the foundation of the Chelsea Porcelain Manufactory.

Family 

Fawkener did not marry until 1747, when aged 53. His wife was Harriet, the natural daughter of Lieutenant General Charles Churchill. A portrait of her by Constantinople-based artist Jean-Étienne Liotard hangs in Compton Verney House. They had a daughter, also named Harriet, who married Edward Bouverie and became the noted society hostess Mrs. Bouverie, and two sons, William Augustus Fawkener and Everard Fawkener of the 11th dragoons.

Fawkener lived at Westhorpe House near Little Marlow.

References

Further reading
Perry, Norma. Sir Everard Fawkener, Friend and Correspondent of Voltaire

1694 births
1758 deaths
English merchants
Ambassadors of Great Britain to the Ottoman Empire
18th-century English people
United Kingdom Postmasters General
Knights Bachelor